Sanson Pereira (born 2 October 1997) is an Indian professional footballer who plays as a defender for Indian Super League club Goa.

Club career
Born in Nuvem, Goa, Pereira began his career with the Salgaocar youth teams after impressing in a trial for the club's under-14 side. In 2016, Pereira was promoted to the club's senior squad and was part of the team that won the Goa Professional League, the top tier state league in Goa, in 2016–17.

On 20 June 2020, it was announced that Pereira has signed with Goa of the Indian Super League. He made his professional debut for the club on 22 November 2020 in the club's opening match against Bengaluru. He started as FC Goa drew the match 2–2.

Career statistics

Club

Honours
Salgaocar
Goa Professional League: 2016–17

Goa
Durand Cup: 2021

References

External links
Profile at the FC Goa website

1997 births
Living people
People from South Goa district
Indian footballers
Association football defenders
Salgaocar FC players
FC Goa players
Goa Professional League players
Indian Super League players
Footballers from Goa